"U Don't Know Me" is a song by American hip hop recording artist T.I., released on January 11, 2005, as the second single from his third studio album, Urban Legend (2004). The single peaked at number 23 on the US Billboard Hot 100 chart. The song appears in the video game Midnight Club 3: DUB Edition.

Accolades 
This song was nominated for several awards including the Grammy for Best Rap Solo Performance, the MTV Video Music Award for "Best Rap Video", and the VIBE award for "Street Anthem of the Year".
It was also ranked 61 on Complex'''s "Best Songs of the Complex Decade".

Music Video
The music video was filmed on various locations in Atlanta, Georgia, and includes cameos by P$C, DJ Toomp, Young Dro, Jazze Pha and Daz Dillinger.

Chart performanceU Don't Know Me'' peaked at number 23 on the US Billboard Hot 100 and number six on the Hot R&B/Hip-Hop Songs charts.  The song spent a total of 20 weeks on the chart. On June 14, 2006, the song was certified platinum by the RIAA for sales of over 1 million copies in the United States.

Charts

Weekly charts

Year-end charts

Certifications

References

2004 songs
2005 singles
T.I. songs
Grand Hustle Records singles
Gangsta rap songs
Song recordings produced by DJ Toomp
Songs written by T.I.